Surirellaceae is a family of diatoms in the order Surirellales.

Genera
 Campylodiscus
 Cymatopleura
 Hydrosilicon
 Iconella
 Petrodictyon
 Plagiodiscus
 Stenopterobia
 Surirella

References

External links
 
 
 Surirellaceae at AlgaeBase

Surirellales
Diatom families